The 2016 Lausitz Superbike World Championship round was the tenth round of the 2016 Superbike World Championship. It took place over the weekend of 16–18 September 2016 at the Lausitzring.

Championship standings after the round

Superbike Championship standings after Race 1

Superbike Championship standings after Race 2

Supersport Championship standings

External links
 Superbike Race 1 results
 Superbike Race 2 results
 Supersport Race results

2016 Superbike World Championship season
Lausitz Superbike World Championship round
Lausitz Superbike World Championship round